Basheer Khan Girls' Degree College is a Degree college for girls located in Usia village of Ghazipur district, Uttar Pradesh, India.

Courses
Bachelor of Arts
Master of Arts
Diploma

References

Colleges in India
Ghazipur district